Butalangu is a town in Central Uganda. It is the political and administrative center of Nakaseke District.

Location
Butalangu is located west of Luweero, the largest town in the sub-region. The geographical coordinates of Butalangu are:0°49'22.0"N, 32°14'34.0"E (Latitude:0.822778; Longitude:32.242778).

Population
During the national census and household survey of 27 and 28 August 2014, the Uganda Bureau of Statistics (UBOS), enumerated the population of Butalangu at 3,873 people.

Points of interest
The Uganda National Roads Authority (UNRA) has requested for parliamentary approval to tarmac the Luweero–Butalangu Road from gravel surface to class II bitumen with drainage channels and culverts. The improvements are budgeted at US$40 million co-financed by the Arab Bank for Economic Development in Africa (BADEA) and the OPEC Fund for International Development (OFID), and are expected  to last two years.

A modern abattoir and meat-processing plant are planned within the town limits. The joint venture between Nakaseke District local government and Uganda Meat Producers Cooperative Union (UMPCU), is expected to receive donor assistance from Norway.

See also
 Luweero Triangle

References

External links
Schools in and near Butalangu

Nakaseke District
Populated places in Uganda
Cities in the Great Rift Valley
Central Region, Uganda